Arthur Russell may refer to:
 Arthur Russell (musician) (1951–1992), American cellist, composer, singer, and disco artist
 Arthur Russell, 2nd Baron Ampthill (1869–1935), British administrator and rower
 Arthur Russell (athlete) (1886–1972), British athlete
 Lord Arthur Russell, (1825–1892), British Member of Parliament
 Sir Arthur Russell, 6th Baronet (1878–1964), British mineralogist
 Arthur Tozer Russell (1806–1874), English clergyman and hymn writer
 Arthur Russell, character in 1935 film Alice Adams

See also